Charles Michael O'Neill (born August 11, 1928) is an American former professional basketball player. He played in four games for the Milwaukee Hawks of the National Basketball Association (NBA) in 1952–53. He recorded 12 points, 9 rebounds, and 3 assists in his brief career.

References

1928 births
Living people
Amateur Athletic Union men's basketball players
American men's basketball players
California Golden Bears men's basketball players
Milwaukee Hawks players
Small forwards
Undrafted National Basketball Association players